Bolpur College, established in 1950, is a government affiliated college located at Bolpur in the Birbhum district of West Bengal. It is affiliated to University of Burdwan and teaches arts, science and commerce.

Accreditation
The college is recognized by the University Grants Commission (UGC).

See also
List of institutions of higher education in West Bengal
Education in India
Education in West Bengal

References

External links
 Bolpur College

Colleges affiliated to University of Burdwan
Educational institutions established in 1950
Universities and colleges in Birbhum district
1950 establishments in West Bengal